Annals of the Faculty of Law in Belgrade – Belgrade Law Review (Serbian: Анали Правног факултета у Београду – часопис за правне и друштвене науке) is academic law journal published by the University of Belgrade Faculty of Law.

About 

Annals of the Faculty of Law in Belgrade – Belgrade Law Review is the oldest Balkan academic law journal, having been founded in 1906 by the University of Belgrade Faculty of Law as Archive for Legal and Social Sciences (Serbian: Arhiv za pravne i društvene nauke). Since 1953 the journal appears as Annals of the Faculty of Law in Belgrade.
 
It is a peer-reviewed journal that utilizes an international body of editors, advisers and referees to select outstanding contributions. The journal solicits articles, contributions, case law and legislation comments, essays, debates, notes and book reviews on all aspects of law and social sciences, being interdisciplinary oriented. Special emphasis is placed on contemporary legal developments, but the journal's range includes jurisprudence and legal history. The journal serves as a forum for the expression of the legal ideas of foremost scholars, law professors, jurists, judges, practitioners, societal leaders and students.

This law review has been published in Serbian and English, offering contributions by the distinguished scholars from Serbia and abroad. The fourth yearly issue is published exclusively in English. It has been published also in electronic form (ISSN: 2406-2693).

Frequency 

Annals of the Faculty of Law in Belgrade is quarterly law journal published at the end of March, June, September and December. Deadlines for submitting articles are: January 31 - for the first issue, April 30 - for the second issue, July 31 - for the third issue and October 31 - for the fourth issue.

Editorial 

Editor-in-chef is Marija Karanikić Mirić.
 
Editors-in-Chief have been the most prominent Serbian law professors and lawyers, such as Mihailo Konstantinović, Milan Bartoš, Vojislav Bakić, Vojislav Simović, Obren Stanković, Dejan Popović, Miodrag Orlić, Danilo Basta, Sima Avramović, Miroljub Labus and Mirko Vasiljević.

Until 2018 yearly international issue (No. 4) in English was co-edited by Alan Watson.

The Editorial Board consists of faculty members of the University of Belgrade Faculty of Law, and the members of the International Editorial Board are some of the most eminent international experts in various legal disciplines.

Indexing 

 DOAJ - Directory of Open Access Journals
 DOI Serbia
 EBSCO
 HeinOnline
 SCIndeks

References 

University of Belgrade academic journals
University of Belgrade Faculty of Law
General law journals
Publications established in 1906
Triannual journals
Multilingual journals
1906 establishments in Serbia